Campfire Songs is the debut and only album by the American band Campfire Songs, released in March 2003. A collaborative work between Dave Portner, Noah Lennox, and Josh Dibb, it was later retroactively classified as the third studio album by their band Animal Collective.

Recording 
The album comprises five individual songs played back to back and recorded in one take. Although it was the middle of November and thus very cold, the recording was made outside on a screen porch in Maryland, using three Sony MiniDisc players with Sony ECM-MS907 microphones placed strategically around the band. Ambient sound from the surrounding area was also recorded on January 2002 and added later to "Queen in My Pictures" and "Moo Rah Rah Rain". The album was mixed at Avey Tare's apartment in Bushwick and later mastered with Nicolas Vernhes at Rare Book Room.

An aborted recording session for the album took place in December 1999, and included the track "Bleak Midwinter", which is not on the final tracklisting.
It premiered on Geologist's radio program The O'Brien System in 2018. "Doggy" was re-worked for live performances along with "Hey Light" from Here Comes the Indian in 2007.

About the recording and the idea for this record, Panda Bear said in 2005:

The three members of Animal Collective performing on this album are Avey Tare, Panda Bear, and Deakin, who makes his debut appearance here. It is their only album featuring this lineup. Although member Geologist does not perform on the album, he was present for the recording to operate the MiniDisc players. At this point in time, despite the presence of all four original members, there was still no Animal Collective proper; the name Campfire Songs was intended to be the name of the band performing the album, as well as the name of the album itself. However, the band name 'Animal Collective' is used in the booklet from the latest copies of the album.

About one week before recording, they played the whole album live at Tonic in New York City, sitting in the middle of the floor while the audience surrounded them.

Campfire Songs is one of only three Animal Collective-related releases (the others being 2007's Strawberry Jam and 2012's Centipede Hz) to include a booklet with full lyrics.

The original Catsup Plate version of the album went out of print in 2008, and was reissued by Paw Tracks Records on January 26, 2010.

Track listing

Personnel 
 Avey Tare (as "Doon") - acoustic guitar, vocals
 Panda Bear (as "Sia") - acoustic guitar, vocals
 Deakin (as "Sweet James") - acoustic guitar, backing vocals

References

External links 
 Catsup Plate

2003 debut albums
Animal Collective albums
New Weird America albums